Jerry Don Sanders (born February 24, 1948) is a former American college football coach and player. Sanders was a placekicker for the Texas Tech Red Raiders for three seasons, and in selected to play in the 1970 Blue–Gray Football Classic. The Cleveland Browns drafted Sanders in the 12th round of the 1970 NFL Draft. Sanders went on to serve as head coach of the inaugural Lubbock Christian Chaparrals, but compiled a record of 0–16 for the 1979 and 1980 seasons.

Head coaching record

Notes

References

External links
 NFL profile

1948 births
Living people
American football placekickers
Lubbock Christian Chaparrals football coaches
Texas Tech Red Raiders football players
People from Littlefield, Texas